Tab Two is a German acid jazz or "hip jazz" band formed in 1991. 'Tab' stands for Trumpet and Bass. The band consists of Hellmut Hattler and Joo Kraus.

History
Bassist Hattler and trumpeter Kraus had played together since 1987, for some of that time as members of Kraan. They began composing together and started Tab Two in 1991. Combining acoustic instruments and electronics, their music was referred to as "hip jazz".

They signed for Virgin Records in Europe, and later Polydor, JVC Victor in Japan, and released eight albums together before splitting up in 1999. Their music was used in commercials for companies such as Mercedes-Benz and Bruno Banani. The duo's 1994 album "Hip Jazz" was named 'CD of the Month' by German magazine Der Wiener.

After interest in reissuing their material, the duo held a press conference in November 2011. The musicians announced a "temporary reunion" with a tour limited to 10 concerts, and the release of the 3CD best-of album Two Thumbs Up in 2012. 

In April 2012, at a festival on occasion of Hellmut Hattler's 60th birthday, Tab Two performed for the first time since 1999. The recordings were released as the 6-track album Live at the Roxy, for download only. 

In February 2013, Tab Two announced the release of the 3-CD set ...Zzzipp! extended. The album consists of the remastered live recordings from the 2000 album ...Zzzipp! plus an additional track of a rehearsal with the audience, and a bonus CD with seven tracks from the 2012 tour. 

In 2013 they played two concerts as Tab Two & Friends, with former guest singer Sandie Wollasch again, and for the first time with a real band, Oli Rubow on drums and Ralf Schmid on keyboards.

Discography
Albums
Mind Movie (1991), Intercord Record Service/EMI
 Space Case (1992), Intercord Record Service
Hip Jazz (1994), Intercord Record Service/Virgin/Victor
Flagman Ahead (1995), Virgin
Belle Affaire (1996), Virgin
Sonic Tools (1997), Virgin
Between Us (1999), Polydor
Zzzipp! (2000), Polydor
Live At The Roxy (2012), 36music (download-only)
Zzzipp! extended (2013)

Compilation albums
Robo Talk (1995), Victor
Tab Two (1997), Virgin
Two Thumbs Up (2012), 36music

Singles
"My Horn" (1993), Intercord Record Service
"This Beat Goes Boom" (1993), Intercord Record Service
"No Flagman Ahead" (1995), Virgin
"Vraiment Paris" (1995), Virgin - promo only
"Let It Flow" (1996), Virgin
"Belle Affaire" (1997), VirginTab Two'' (1997) - promo only
"Get There II" (1998), Polydor
"No Way No War" (1999), Polydor

References

External links
 
 Facebook (official page)
 Soundcloud
 Discogs

German musical duos
Musical groups established in 1991
Musical groups disestablished in 1999
Musical groups reestablished in 2012
1991 establishments in Germany